Flaviflexus massiliensis is a bacterium from the genus of Flaviflexus which has been isolated from the human gut.

References

Actinomycetales
Bacteria described in 2016